Nemastoma lugubre is an harvestmen species found in the whole of Europe from the Arctic to the Mediterranean.

The body is small and rotund and 2.5 mm long. It is black with two large white, pale yellow cream-coloured or silver patches on the cephalothorax. Some specimens lack the patches and are entirely black. The legs are short.

Subspecies
 Nemastoma lugubre lugubre (Müller, 1776) 
 Nemastoma lugubre bimaculatum (Fabricius, 1775) — Europe
 Nemastoma lugubre unicolor Roewer, 1914 — southern Europe

Harvestmen
Arachnids of Europe
Animals described in 1776
Taxa named by Otto Friedrich Müller